The men's high jump event at the 1954 British Empire and Commonwealth Games was held on 1 July at the Empire Stadium in Vancouver, Canada.

A new Commonwealth record was established by Emmanuel Ifeajuna of Nigeria, who became the first Commonwealth athlete to clear six feet and eight inches. Ifeajuna was also the first black African to win a gold medal at the Commonwealth Games.

Results

References

Athletics at the 1954 British Empire and Commonwealth Games
1954